João Vitor Lima Gomes, or simply João Vitor (born 1 June 1988), is a Brazilian footballer who plays as a central midfielder for Água Santa.

Club career
In April 2019, he signed a contract with Coritiba.

Honours
Palmeiras
Copa do Brasil: 2012

References

External links

esportes.yahoo 
Central Brasileirão 
Profile at palmeiras.com.br 

1988 births
Living people
People from Maceió
Brazilian footballers
Brazilian expatriate footballers
Association football midfielders
Campeonato Brasileiro Série A players
Campeonato Brasileiro Série B players
Süper Lig players
Marília Atlético Clube players
Grêmio Barueri Futebol players
Sociedade Esportiva Palmeiras players
Criciúma Esporte Clube players
Figueirense FC players
Associação Atlética Ponte Preta players
Coritiba Foot Ball Club players
Gaziantepspor footballers
Centro Sportivo Alagoano players
Brazilian expatriate sportspeople in Turkey
Expatriate footballers in Turkey
Sportspeople from Alagoas